Kharsor (also known as Ḩarsel and Kharsol) is a village in Khafri Rural District, in the Central District of Sepidan County, Fars Province, Iran. At the 2006 census, its population was 17, in 5 families.

References 

Populated places in Sepidan County